Bayo Road, in Los Alamos, New Mexico, was listed on the National Register of Historic Places in 2003.  It is also known as Bayo Canyon Road.

canyon located between Barranca and North mesas, Los Alamos."  It is largely on bedrock, and runs east-west, in part through a ponderosa pine forest.

It is significant as a historic homestead road;  it long served homesteads in the area.  But in 1943 the area was abruptly closed to access when it was acquired for use by the Manhattan Project to build an atomic bomb, and Army security forces subsequently patrolled the area.

It perhaps coincides partly or wholly with the modern Bayo Canyon Trail, which is identifiable in online maps.

References

National Register of Historic Places in Los Alamos County, New Mexico
Roads in New Mexico